Kevin Pogue is a professor of geology at Whitman College in Walla Walla, Washington, known for his expertise on terroir for winegrape production, a specialty in which he has been termed a "leading global expert". He works both as an academic geologist, and as a consultant for grape farmers and land investors. The New York Times said "[t]he importance of the work of Dr. Pogue...signals the increasing maturity and seriousness of the Washington wine industry. In 2018, Dr. Pogue was the recipient of the Walter Clore Honorarium from the Washington State Wine Commission, for his service as an "ambassador, mentor, and champion of Washington Wines".

Early life and education
Pogue is from Lexington, Kentucky. He and received a B.S. in geology from the University of Kentucky, and an M.S. in geology from Idaho State University. He received a doctorate in geology from Oregon State University.

The Rocks District of Milton-Freewater AVA

In 2013–2014, Pogue did geological research for, and was the petitioner for, the first sub-appellation of the Walla Walla Valley AVA to be called The Rocks District of Milton–Freewater American Viticultural Area (The Rocks AVA).

Candy Mountain AVA

Pogue is the author of the petition that created the Candy Mountain American Viticultural Area in September of 2020. Candy Mountain is a sub-appellation of both the Yakima Valley and Columbia Valley AVAs.

White Bluffs AVA

Pogue is the author of the petition that created White Bluffs American Viticultural Area in June of 2021. White Bluffs is a sub-appellation of the Columbia Valley AVA.

Rock Climbing

Pogue has been a prolific developer of rock climbing routes, particularly in the Pacific Northwest. He began climbing in 1975 in the Red River Gorge in eastern Kentucky, an hour drive east of his home in Lexington. He made early ascents of many traditional routes and participated in several traditional first ascents with his primary partner, Ed Pearsall, whom he encouraged to write the Red River Gorge's second climbing guidebook. After moving to Idaho in 1981, Pogue climbed extensively in the City of Rocks. While climbing at the City of Rocks, he began to developing bolt-protected sport climbs with his ascent of Conceptual Reality on the Gallstone in 1985. Since that time Pogue has developed many very popular routes in the City of Rocks and adjoining Castle Rocks State Park, including Theater of Shadows, Sinocranium, Big Time, and Mantle Dynamics. On visits to his family in Lexington, Pogue returned to the Red River Gorge and established sport routes including Creature Feature and Pogue Ethics. After moving to Oregon in the mid-1980's Pogue climbed often at Smith Rock State Park, where he established the climbs Helium Woman and Captain Xenolith in the Dihedrals area. After moving to Washington in 1990 Pogue discovered the basalt columns of Frenchman Coulee near Vantage. He was a pioneer in the development of sport climbing at Frenchman Coulee where he eventually established 38 routes, mostly on the Sunshine Wall, that include Ride'em Cowboy, Vantage Point, and Hakuna Matata. He eventually discovered the andesite cliffs of Spring Mountain, in the Blue Mountains, close to his home in Walla Walla. During the 1990's Pogue established 50 routes at Spring Mountain. Pogue has also developed over 20 routes at an area known as The Dikes in the Blue Mountains near Dayton, Washington, and has contributed extensively to the development of climbing routes at Wallula Gap on the Columbia River. During his travels, Pogue also managed to establish one, now popular route on the Magic Bus formation in Red Rocks called Neon Sunset.

References

Further reading

External links

Living people
American geologists
Whitman College faculty
University of Kentucky alumni
Idaho State University alumni
People from Walla Walla, Washington
Educators from Kentucky
People from Lexington, Kentucky
Year of birth missing (living people)